KCDV, The Eagle, is a commercial adult contemporary music radio station in Cordova, Alaska, United States, broadcasting on 100.9 FM. The station started broadcasting on April 19, 1997, under the management of Bayview Communications. KCDV plays a mix of music from the 1980s and onwards.

History 
Before KCDV started broadcasting in 1997, the main station in the Cordova area was KLAM AM, broadcasting a range of genres including 80's, classic rock and country, along with news and sport.

Technical 
The station broadcasts on 100.9 FM at 970 watts with a range of approximately 27 miles. KCDV broadcasts in high fidelity stereo.

References

External links
 
 

1983 establishments in Alaska
Mainstream adult contemporary radio stations in the United States
Buildings and structures in Chugach Census Area, Alaska
Cordova, Alaska
Radio stations established in 1983
CDV